Lump Sugar (or Lump of Sugar) is a 2006 South Korean film directed by Lee Hwan-kyung and starring actress Im Soo-jung.

Plot
The film revolves around Si-eun (played by Im), who dreams of becoming a famous jockey. It is the first Korean movie to show the friendship between a human and a horse and to feature a horse race.

Cast
Im Soo-jung as Kim Shi-eun
Kim Yoo-jung as young Kim Shi-eun
Choi Hak-rak as Kim Jo
Park Eun-Soo as Ik-du (Shi-eun's dad)
Yu Oh-seong as Yun-jo

References

External links
https://web.archive.org/web/20061224021720/http://www.lumpsugar.co.kr/ 
 
 
 

2006 films
2000s Korean-language films
South Korean sports drama films
2000s sports drama films
Films directed by Lee Hwan-kyung
Films about horses
Films set in Jeju
2006 drama films
2000s South Korean films